The Maya or Mayan Lowlands are the largest of three common first-order sub-divisions of the Mayan Region of Mesoamerica.

Extent

The Mayan Lowlands are restricted by the Gulf of Mexico to the north, the Caribbean Sea to the east, and the Mayan Highlands to the south and west. The precise northern and eastern limits of the Lowlands are widely agreed upon, being formed by conspicuous bodies of water. Their southern and western limits, however, are not precisely fixed, as these are restricted by 'subtle environmental changes or transitions from one zone [the Highlands] to another [the Lowlands],' rather than conspicuous geographic features.

The Lowlands fully encompass Belize, the Guatemalan department of Peten, and the Mexican states of Campeche, Yucatan, and Quintana Roo. They may further partially encompass a number of northerly Guatemalan departments, northwesterly Honduran departments, and southeasterly Mexican states.

Divisions 

The Lowlands are usually sub-divided either into northern and southern regions, or into northern, central, and southern regions. As with the LowlandsHighlands border, the boundaries of the Lowlands' internal sub-divisions are not precisely fixed, being rather formed by gradual environmental or climatic transitions.

Northern 

Their rainy season typically lasts six or seven months during JuneDecember, with a subsequent six- or five-month dry season. Their terrain is predominated by tropical forests in the south, gradually giving way to low bush-and-scrub forests in the north. Prominent bodies of water include Lake Bacalar and various cenotes. Prominent groupings of archaeological sites within the Northern Lowlands include the Northern Plains, the East Coast, the Puuc, and the Chenes sites.

The Northern Lowlands generally encompass portions of Campeche, Yucatan, and Quintana Roo in Mexico.

Central 

Their rainy season typically lasts eight-and-a-half months, from mid-May to January, with a subsequent dry season of three-and-a-half months, from February to mid-May. Their terrain is predominated by low east-west ridges of folded and faulted limestone, covered by tropical forests, grasslands, and wetlands. Prominent bodies of water include the Hondo, New, and Belize Rivers and their tributaries, and a roughly  drainage basin in central Peten housing some fourteen lakes, the largest of which is Lake Peten Itza.

The Central Lowlands generally encompass portions of Peten in Guatemala, Campeche and Quintana Roo in Mexico, and Cayo, Belize [District], Orange Walk, and Corozal in Belize.

Southern 

Their rainy season ranges between nine to eleven months, with the dry season compressed to three months or fewer, with the latter typically occurring during MarchMay. Their terrain ranges from broken karst topography, predominated by rain-forest and limestone formations, to low-lying coastal topography, predominated by swamps. Prominent bodies of water within the Southern Lowlands, which often feature relatively deep and fertile soils, include the Usumacinta River and its tributaries, the Sarstoon River, Lake Izabal, the Rio Dulce, the alluvial valley of the lower Motagua, and the Chamelecon and Ulua Rivers.

The Southern Lowlands generally encompass portions of Chiapas, Tabasco, and Campeche in Mexico, Huehuetenango, El Quiche, Alta Verapaz, Izabal, and Peten in Guatemala, Cayo, Stann Creek, and Toledo in Belize, and Cortes, Santa Barbara, and Copan in Honduras.

Geography

Physical 

The Lowlands are generally characterised by elevations below  and a tropical climate. They are predominantly covered by evergreen tropical forests, which tend to grow taller and denser in the southern Lowlands, given increased rainfall in this area, compared to the northern Lowlands, which experience relatively less rainfall. The climate of the eastern coasts is made relatively warmer and more humid by the Atlantic North Equatorial Current and the Gulf Stream.

Geology

Morphology

Provinces 

The Lowlands are thought to fully or partially encompass at least eleven geologic provinces. Notably, the northern and central Lowlands 'encompass the most extensive karstlands of the North American continent' ie the Yucatan Platform.

Basins 
The Lowlands are believed to fully or partially comprehend at least four sedimentary basins.

Tectonics 
The Lowlands lie wholly within the Maya Block of the North American Plate. They notably house the Ticul Fault to the north, the Rio Hondo, Yucatan Channel, and Maya Mountain Faults to the east, and a portion of the MotaguaPolochic Fault Zone to the south.

Stratigraphy 

In the northern and central Lowlands, encompassed within the Yucatan Platform, mean crustal thickness increases from 1216 miles (2025 km) in the north to 1925 miles (3040 km) in the south. These portions of the Lowlands are blanketed by a carbonate sedimentary cover reaching a mean thickness of up to some 4 miles (6 km).

Notes and references

Explanatory footnotes

Short citations

Full citations

Print

Journals

Other 
 
 
 
 
 

Geography of Mesoamerica
Pre-Columbian cultural areas